ConCoction is a full-spectrum multi-genre fantasy and science fiction convention based in Cleveland, Ohio, and is annually in March. It is a not-for-profit endeavor run by the local and regional community of fans to promote Community Service, Education, and the Arts in Northeastern, Ohio.

ConCoction as a convention offers several tracks of programming in the arts, costuming, music/filk, literary, media, and the sciences. The convention also includes such events as an art show, a masquerade, an exhibit hall, a gaming hall, and at least one dance. ConCoction also has a children's track of programming that has included open gaming, make and take crafts and the attack of Godzilla as well as costuming, and science programs.

In 2016 this group celebrated the theme of "Space", where they commemorated the 50th anniversary of TriCon, the 24th World Science Fiction Convention held in Cleveland, Ohio on 1–5 September 1966 at the Sheraton-Cleveland and the pilot premier of Star Trek.

History

ConCoction 2017 (4) 
March 10–12, 2017
2017 Convention Guests:
Author Guest - Glen Cook 
Media Guest - Jim O'Rear
Cosplay - Mogchelle Cosplay
Cosplay - KayceSuper
Cosplay - Katie Starr
Music - The Blibbering Humdingers
Gaming - Lee Garvin
ConSuite - Cassandra Fear

ConCoction 2016 (3) 
March 11–13, 2016
 John Morton – Actor
 Five Year Mission – Music Guest
 Michael Longcor - Music Guest 
 Eddy Webb – Gaming Guest 
 Christopher L. Bennett – Author Guest 
 Santiago Cirilo - Actor/Director
 Mogchelle - Cosplay Guest
 Alexa Heart - Cosplay Guest
Theme: "Space & Puppets (in honor of the Star Trek 50th Anniversary and debut at TriCon 1966 in Cleveland, Ohio)"

ConCoction 2015 (2) 
March 13–15, 2015 - Approximately 625 attendees
 Tasia Valenza – Actress & Voiceover Actress
 This Way to the Egress – Music Guest
 M. Alice LeGrow – Artist Guest 
 Andy Looney – Gaming Guest 
 S. Andrew Swann – Author Guest 
 Knightmage - Cosplay Guest
 Mogchelle - Cosplay Guest
 Princess Nightmare - Cosplay Guest
Theme: "Steampunk in Wonderland"

ConCoction 2014 (1) 
May 30 - June 1, 2014 - approximately 475 attendees
 Rod Roddenberry – Media Guest of Honor
 Santiago Cirilo – Media Guest 
 Heather Kreiter – Artist Guest 
 Sean Patrick Fannon – Gaming Guest 
 Mandala/Witherwings – Filk Guest 
 Wax Chaotic – Filk Guest
 Tonks and the Aurors – Filk Guest
 2d6 Music – Music Guest
Theme: "Bring Your Genre!"

References

External links
 Cleveland ConCoction official website

Fan convention
Multigenre conventions

Science fiction conventions in the United States
Culture of Cleveland
Conventions in Ohio